Agnes Beatrice Warburg (1872–1953) was a British photographer who contributed to the acceptance of colour photography in the English-speaking world. She had been encouraged to take up photography by her brother, John Cimon Warburg (1867–1931), who also worked with colour.

Warburg exhibited at the Linked Ring and at the Royal Photographic Society, where she was a founder-member of the Pictorial and Colour Groups. As a result of her Pictorialist approach, she used photography as an art form rather than for commercial gain. Her results using the Autochrome process were of a remarkably high quality.

References

External links
Morning Bathe (1937) by Agnes Warburg

1872 births
1953 deaths
19th-century English women artists
19th-century women photographers
20th-century English women artists
20th-century women photographers
English women photographers
Photographers from London